William Reilly may refer to:
 William K. Reilly (born 1940), Environmental Protection Agency administrator
 William L. Reilly (1916–2009), American Jesuit and academic
 William J. Reilly (1899–1970), American economist
 William Edward Moyses Reilly (1827–1886), British Army general
 William Arthur Reilly (1903–1969), American political figure from Boston
 Bill Reilly (William Francis Reilly, 1938–2008), American publishing and media executive
 Bill Reilly (athlete) (William L. Reilly, born 1943), American steeplechase runner
 Will Reilly (born 2002), American soccer player
 William K. Reilly, pseudonym used by English writer John Creasey (1908–1973)